Michael Sydney Foster (born 3 February 1939) is an English former footballer who played as a winger in the Football League for Colchester United and Millwall. He was also signed to Leicester City and Norwich City, though he made no appearances for those clubs.

Career

Born in Leicester, Foster came through the ranks at hometown club Leicester City, but was never selected for the first team. He transferred to Colchester United nominally in 1961, making his professional debut on the opening day of the 1961–62 season in a 3–0 victory over Stockport County at Layer Road. He scored his first goal for the club on 26 August during a 2–2 draw away at Oldham Athletic.

During his single season with the U's, Foster made 36 league appearances, scoring eight goals and assisted Colchester to promotion to the Third Division. His final goal for the club came on 23 March 1962, the opening goal of a 2–0 victory against Mansfield Town. He made his final Colchester appearance on the final day of the season, a 5–3 away victory over Doncaster Rovers.

Foster left Colchester for Norwich City for £3,000 in the summer of 1962 in a deal that also saw Roy McCrohan head to the U's. He failed to break into the first-team at Norwich and did not make any appearances for the club. He later joined Millwall in the 1963–64 season, making 13 appearances and scoring two goals. He left the professional game after leaving Millwall.

Honours

Colchester United
1961–62 Fourth Division runner-up (Level 4)

All honours referenced by:

References

1939 births
Living people
Footballers from Leicester
English footballers
Association football wingers
Leicester City F.C. players
Colchester United F.C. players
Norwich City F.C. players
Millwall F.C. players
English Football League players